George Campbell School of Technology is a public high school specialising in technical education, located in Durban, KwaZulu-Natal, South Africa. The school was founded as George Campbell Technical High School in 1963 and today has a co-educational student body of over 1100 pupils. The curriculum includes the compulsory subjects of Mathematics, Science, Technical drawing, English and Afrikaans.

Electives offered are:
Motor mechanics
Electrician work
Fitting and turning
Technika electronic
Technika mechanical
Technika electrical

Facilities
 The Media Centre is available to all students to use during breaks and after school. Besides books, there are computers connected to the Internet, printers and photocopy facilities. The school employs a full-time librarian.
 The swimming pool is 25m long and is used extensively by the school swimming and water polo teams.
 The Information Technology Centre is divided into two sections so that two classes can be accommodated at the same time. One section has 32 computers and the other 34. In 2006 a third computer room was added with 34 computers. The computers in the centre are networked, linked to high speed printers and the Internet. All students do ICDL or Computer Literacy classes in grades 8 and 9 where they learn about the parts, construction and development of the computer, the Internet, and programs.

In Grade 10 learners have the choice of doing either IT, where they learn programming, such as Java, or CAT (Computer Applications Technology) where they learn computer applications such as databases, word processors and webpage design. These subjects are done through to grade 12.

The school is a registered ICDL (International Computer Driving Licence) centre where learners and staff can be trained and tested to obtain an ICDL, an internationally recognised computer qualification.

Electrical Technology Centre
The Electrical Technology Centre is a very well-equipped centre which can accommodate the following disciplines covered in the curriculum: Electrical (Heavy current), Electronics (Light current), Digital systems and Communication Systems. In the Electrical Department we place high importance on the practical component. This component is vital to back up the theory.

Civil Technology Centre
Group 5 is building an outside facility on the school premises where students will be able to do practicals pertinent to civil technology, i.e. concrete slump tests, concrete beam testing, etc.

The FET curriculum expose the students to the field of architecture i.e. house design, bridge design, materials, tools, etc. Students discover how buildings are designed and built and explore the materials used to build these structures.

Mechanical Technology Centre
The NCS document has introduced a new subject into the syllabus called Mechanical Technology. The subject focuses on technology processes including design, problem solving, and the application of scientific principles. The subject includes all the previous subjects (Motor Mechanics, Fitting and Turning, Technica Mechanica) and combines them into one subject - Mechanical Technology.

AutoCAD Centre
The CAD centre runs 35 computers with AutoCAD. There are four teachers qualified to teach AutoCAD to the Grade 10 to Grade 12 learners. The Grade 12 learners are also taught 3D-modelling.

Sport
There are 14 teams who take the field on Saturdays with the Under 14 and 15s beating some of the schools in the top 3 in KZN. In 2007 the school became a force again in rugby as the first team played 15 games and won 11. The school hosted the annual FNB KZN-GAUTENG Tournament, the Springboks also trained at the school's rugby fields before heading to France.

The school also offers:
Swimming
Rugby Sevens
Soccer
Water polo
Hockey
Cricket
Surfing & Body boarding
Netball
Chess

The school also offers extra-mural activities such as
Poetry
Drama
Art
Choir
Revolution's Club
Interact Club
Durban Youth Council

External links

Education in Durban
Schools of technology in KwaZulu-Natal
Educational institutions established in 1963
1963 establishments in South Africa